The Joseph H. Lauder Institute of Management & International Studies (The Lauder Institute) offers a joint degree program at the University of Pennsylvania, combining an MA in international studies from the School of Arts & Sciences with an MBA from The Wharton School or JD from the Law School. Students pursue one of six Programs of Concentration focused on five regional areas (Africa, East and Southeast Asia, Europe, Latin America, or South Asia, the Middle East and North Africa) or the Global Program. Within the regional Programs of Concentration, students must attain superior language proficiency based upon an oral proficiency interview certified by Language Testing International in either Arabic, Chinese, French, German, Hindi, Japanese, Korean, Portuguese, Russian, or Spanish.

Each year 60–70 students from around the world join the Lauder Program in May starting in Philadelphia before departing on an 8-week summer immersion to their respective regions of study. Students return to campus in August to join the MBA or JD program and then graduate with their class two years later. In the most recent incoming class, 60% of the class were US Citizens and 40% were international or dual citizens.

History
The Lauder Institute was founded in 1983 by Leonard A. Lauder and Ronald S. Lauder in memory of their father, Joseph H. Lauder. Leonard A. Lauder was awarded the Foreign Language Advocacy Award in 1990 by the Northeast Conference on the Teaching of Foreign Languages in recognition of Mr. Lauder's support for the requirement that MBA students in the Institute attain superior levels of linguistic proficiency and engage in immersion experiences to attain cultural proficiency.

References

External links
 

Business schools in Pennsylvania
University of Pennsylvania
Educational institutions established in 1983
1983 establishments in Pennsylvania
Estée Lauder Companies